A demigod is a half human and half godlike being.

Demigod may also refer to:

In music
 Demigod (band), a Finnish death metal band
 Demigod (album), an album by the band Behemoth
 "Demigod", a song from Demonic Art by Darkane
 Demigodz, an underground hip-hop super group which originated in Connecticut
In television
 Demi-Gods and Semi-Devils (1982 TV series)
 Demi-Gods and Semi-Devils (1997 TV series)
 Demi-Gods and Semi-Devils (2003 TV series)
 Legend of the Demigods
In literature
 Demi-Gods and Semi-Devils, a novel by Jin Yong
Characters from Rick Riordan's young adult fiction series Percy Jackson & the Olympians
In video games
 Demigod (video game), a real time strategy computer game